Jerome Urban (1914-1991) was an American surgical oncologist who promoted superradical mastectomies until 1963, when the lack of difference in ten-year survival rates convinced him that it worked no better than the less-mutilating radical mastectomy.

Education
Born in Brooklyn, he attended Andrew College and then Columbia University College of Physicians and Surgeons.  He was a resident in the surgical oncology program of Memorial Sloan-Kettering under George T. Pack.

References

1914 births
1991 deaths
American surgeons
American oncologists
Columbia University Vagelos College of Physicians and Surgeons alumni
20th-century surgeons